Fe, Esperanza y Caridad (English: Faith, Hope and Charity) is a Mexican film comprising three short stories. It was made in 1974.

Synopsis  
The film compiles three stories, each named for part of the main title. The first, "Fe" (Faith), is the story of a woman who travels to a distant town seeking a miracle to save her husband from disease. On the journey she is raped by fellow pilgrims; returning home she finds that the miracle has taken place and her husband is well. She vows to make the pilgrimage again the next year. The second story, "Esperanza" (Hope), concerns a man who, hoping to help his mother, consents to be nailed to a cross as part of a "JesusChrist" freak show. Unfortunately he is unable to afford the silver nails that would have helped him avoid infection. The final story, "Caridad" (Charity), stars Katy Jurado as a humble woman facing a lack of charity from those in authority. She comes into conflict with her son over a childish fight, and her husband is killed.

Cast

Fe (Faith) 
 Fabiola Falcón
 Beto, el Boticario
 Queta Carrasco
 Armando Silvestre
 Leonor Llausás
 Fernando Soto "Mantequilla"

Esperanza (Hope) 
 Milton Rodríguez
 Raul Ástor
 Anita Blanch
 Lilia Prado
 Sasha Montenegro

Caridad (Charity) 
 Katy Jurado
 Julio Aldama
 Sara García
 Stella Inda

External links 
 

1974 films
1970s Spanish-language films
1974 drama films
Films directed by Luis Alcoriza
Films directed by Jorge Fons
Mexican drama films
1970s Mexican films